Sabuhi Hidayat oglu Mammadov is an Azerbaijani banker and politician. He serves as Prime Minister of the Nakhchivan Autonomous Republic.

Early life 
Sabuhi Mammadov was born on 1 May 1969 in Ibadulla village of Sharur region of Nakhchivan Autonomous Republic. After graduating from high school, he graduated from the Faculty of Economics of the Azerbaijan Agricultural Academy with a degree in "Accounting, Control and Analysis of Economic Activity."

Career 
He was appointed Minister of Finance of the Nakhchivan Autonomous Republic by the Order of the Chairman of the Supreme Assembly of the Nakhchivan Autonomous Republic Vasif Talibov on February 6, 2017 and as a Deputy Prime Minister-Minister of Finance on November 30, 2018. On May 23, 2020, Talibov appointed him as Prime Minister upon the recommendation of President Ilham Aliyev.

Recognition 

 Progress Prize.
 Honored Civil Servant.
 Azerbaijan Democratic Republic 100th anniversary medal (2019)

Personal life 
He is married and has 4 children.

References 

People from the Nakhchivan Autonomous Republic
1969 births
Living people
Local politicians in Azerbaijan
New Azerbaijan Party politicians
Recipients of the Azerbaijan Democratic Republic 100th anniversary medal